Newtown Creek is a tributary of Churn Creek in Shasta County, California, in the United States.

References

Rivers of California